Gary Olsen (born Gary Kenneth Grant; 3 November 1957 – 12 September 2000) was an English actor. He played Ben in the BBC television sitcom 2point4 Children.

Biography
Olsen was born in London and lived with an aunt and uncle after both his parents, Patricia and Kenny, died when he was young. He attended the Archbishop Tenison's Church of England School in Kennington. After school he joined various junior stage groups and toured with fringe theatrical companies, such as Incubus and Lumiere and Son, until late 1976. At this point he immersed himself in the punk rock scene as lead vocalist with the band Swank (alongside future members of the Lurkers, Chelsea, and Cuddly Toys) until returning to theatre in 1978. Later he helped develop the musical production Up on the Roof, in which he starred in 1987 at London's Donmar and Apollo theatres.

He made his screen debut in 1979 as Rory Storm in Birth of The Beatles, and appeared in numerous British films and television programmes, including Quadrophenia after being suggested to the director by his long time friend Gary Holton. He played PC Dave Litten in the first series of The Bill, but achieved mainstream success only with the role of Ben in the sitcom 2point4 Children (1991–1999). He played a starring film role as Arthur Hoyle alongside Samantha Janus and Neil Morrissey in the rugby league comedy, Up 'n' Under. He appeared in many TV adverts, including a 1996 National Westminster Bank advertising campaign.

In addition to his screen appearances he made numerous stage appearances including The Rocky Horror Show and What the Butler Saw. He also played 'Pope Liberty III' in the Australian production of the musical Bad Boy Johnny and the Prophets of Doom.

Olsen appeared as Steve in The Comic Strip Presents... parody of The Fly, called The Yob. He also starred with Brian Bovell in the 1986 TV series Prospects about two young men in the Docklands trying to get ahead but usually failing.

Television roles
Olsen appeared in two episodes of the 1981 BBC TV series The Day of the Triffids as a street gang leader who later became an armed paramilitary officer.

He played PC Dave Litten in 12 episodes of The Bill between 1984 and 1986 (as well as the 1983 pilot episode, Woodentop). Olsen also starred in the 1986 TV series Prospects alongside Brian Bovell who played Jez Littlewood in Gimme Gimme Gimme, about two friends living in the Docklands area trying their hand at anything to make a "few bob". In 1988, he appeared in the EastEnders spin-off CivvyStreet as Albert, the patriarch of the Beale family. His most prominent role was as Ben Porter in 2point4 Children (1991–1999). He also had leading roles in another two short-lived BBC sitcoms Health and Efficiency (1993–1995) and Pilgrim's Rest opposite Gwen Taylor for one series in 1997. From 1999–2000 he played Johno in the Daz Dogs adverts and sponsors.

Stage roles
Olsen was critically acclaimed for a number of his roles in musicals including The Rocky Horror Show, Cut and Thrust, Gorky Brigade, Welcome Home, The Pope's Wedding, Saved Dialogues, Metamorphosis, Serious Money, What the Butler Saw, Way of the World, and Bad Boy Johnny and the Prophets of Doom. He received particular praise for his portrayal of Moey in On the Ledge at the National Theatre in 1993. Two years later he appeared in April in Paris at the same theatre. His last stage role was as Evan in Art by Yasmina Reza , in 2000.

Personal life
Olsen married Candy Davis (later known as the crime writer Mo Hayder) in 1985; they later divorced. He married Australian Jane Anthony in 1991; the couple had two children. After a ten-month illness with cancer, Olsen died on 12 September 2000 in Victoria, Australia, where he had emigrated following his diagnosis. He was 42 years old.

Selected filmography

References

External links

Gary Olsen at British Comedy Guide

1957 births
2000 deaths
Deaths from cancer in Victoria (Australia)
English emigrants to Australia
English male film actors
English male stage actors
English male television actors
Male actors from London
Male actors from Melbourne
20th-century English male actors